Naba may refer to:

Places
Al Naba'ah, an area of the emirate of Sharjah in the United Arab Emirates
Mong-Naba, a village in the Zoaga Department of Boulgou Province in south-eastern Burkina Faso
Naba, Sagaing, Burma
Naba-Sougdin, a village in the Tenkodogo Department of Boulgou Province in south-eastern Burkina Faso

Others
An-Naba, the 78th sura (chapter) of the Qur'an
Al-Naba, a newspaper of the Islamic State of Iraq and the Levant
Mogho Naba, King of the Mossi, an ethnic group in Burkina Faso
Moro-Naba Ceremony, a weekly event in Ouagadougou, Burkina Faso
Naba language, a language spoken in Chad
"Taba naba", a children's song from the Torres Strait Islands north of Australia
An older name for Naha, Okinawa, Japan

Acronym
National Adult Baseball Association
National Air Barrier Association
North American Boxing Association, an affiliate of the World Boxing Association
North American Broadcasters Association
North American Butterfly Association
Nuova Accademia di Belle Arti, a privately run university in Milan, Italy
National Association of Black Accountants

See also
Nabaa (disambiguation)
 Nabas (disambiguation)